Anthanthrone is a synthetic anthraquinone.  Its derivative 4,10-dibromoanthanthrone (Pigment Red 168) is a component of some industrial paints.  It is prepared from naphthostyril.

References

Polycyclic aromatic compounds
Quinones
Organic pigments
IARC Group 3 carcinogens